USS Terror may refer to the following ships operated by the United States Navy:

 Terror, a screw tugboat built in 1861 at St. Louis, Missouri; transferred to the U.S. Navy on 30 September 1862 and renamed 
 , a  monitor  originally commissioned as Agamenticus, 5 May 1864; broken up 1874
 , a minelayer commissioned 15 July 1942 and sold for scrap in 1971

United States Navy ship names